Rich Bride Poor Bride is a television series shown on Slice and the WE: Women's Entertainment network. It follows the planning stages of a wedding. Each episode begins with a suggested budget and then follows the bride and groom as they struggle to plan their wedding. At the end of the episode the budget is revealed, and as they couple tally up the cost, the viewers learn whether they were under or over budget.

External links
WE's official site
Slice's official site
Rich Bride Poor Bride - BridesTelevision.com

2000s Canadian reality television series
2008 Canadian television series debuts
Wedding television shows
Television series by Corus Entertainment
Canadian dating and relationship reality television series